The 2018 European Fencing Under 23 Championships was held in Yerevan, Armenia from 15 to 19 April 2018 at the Yerevan State University indoor sports arena.

Schedule

Medal summary

Men's events

Women's events

Medal table

See also
Armenian Fencing Federation

External links
Official website

European Fencing Under 23 Championships
International sports competitions hosted by Armenia
European Fencing Under 23 Championships
Sport in Yerevan
European Fencing Under 23 Championships
Fencing competitions